Lebohang Motlomelo is a Mosothofilm maker, director, writer and cinematographer.

Filmography
 Walking in the Dark
 The Ghost
 The Lost Cause

Awards
He won his first award or recognized locally with the movie The Ghost and had international recognition with the film.

References

Living people
Lesotho film directors
Year of birth missing (living people)